In the upper part of the medulla oblongata, the hypoglossal nucleus approaches the rhomboid fossa, where it lies close to the middle line, under an eminence named the hypoglossal trigone. It is a slight elevation in the floor of the inferior recess of the fourth ventricle, beneath which is the nucleus of origin of the twelfth cranial nerve.

References
and the Free Medical Dictionary.

External links
 https://web.archive.org/web/20070927162218/http://www.ib.amwaw.edu.pl/anatomy/atlas/image_04be.htm
https://medical-dictionary.thefreedictionary.com/hypoglossal+trigone

Cranial nerve nuclei